The 1985 Curaçao Grand Prix  was a one-off Formula 3000 race in Willemstad, Curaçao. The race was organised by the SCCA. The Grand Prix was run in the streets of the city. As the track was very slippery the cars initially used wet weather tires. During the race the cars ran on qualifier tires. John Nielsen won the 58 lap race with a 21-second lead over Ivan Capelli.

Results

Qualifying

Race

Plans for potential Formula One race and demise 
Around the same time the event organisers planned the event to become part of the Formula One calendar in the future. While the event was praised by press and public, the plans for Formula One race ended as the track would have needed substantial improvements to meet the FIA requirements to host Formula One event. A second Curaçao Grand Prix was scheduled as part of the 1986 International Formula 3000 Championship, but it was eventually dropped from the calendar.

References

International Formula 3000
1985 in motorsport
1985 in Dutch motorsport